Cathy McGowan may refer to:

 Cathy McGowan (presenter) (born 1943), British broadcaster and journalist known for presenting Ready Steady Go!
 Cathy McGowan (politician) (born 1953), member of the Parliament of Australia representing the Division of Indi (2013–2019)
Kathy McGowan, author associated with Evil Genius (book series)